The Rural Municipality of Reciprocity No. 32 is a rural municipality (RM) in the Canadian province of Saskatchewan within Census Division No. 1 and  Division No. 1. It is located in the southeast portion of the province.

Etymology 
Reciprocity No. 32 is named after the Reciprocity Treaty, a free trade agreement which was a controversial election issue in 1911. The treaty was defeated, along with Wilfrid Laurier's government, in the same year. The name was suggested by J. Adolph Lemay, the R.M. secretary of the time.

History 

The RM of Reciprocity No. 32 incorporated as a rural municipality on December 11, 1911.

Geography 
The western edge of the RM runs along the 102nd meridian west.

Communities and localities 
The following urban municipalities are surrounded by the RM:

Villages
 Alida

The following unincorporated communities are within the RM:

Localities
 Cantal
 Nottingham

Rivers 
Antler River
Auburnton Creek
Lightning Creek (at the extreme north-east corner of the RM)

Transportation
Highway 8 ( at the north-east corner of the RM
Highway 601
Highway 361
Highway 318
Alida/Cowan Farm Private Aerodrome

Demographics 

Economy 
The RM's economy is based on agriculture and oil.

Government 
The RM of Reciprocity No. 32 is governed by an elected municipal council and an appointed administrator that meets on the second Thursday of every month. The reeve of the RM is Alan Arthur while its administrator is Marilyn J. Larsen. The RM's office is located in Alida.

See also 
 List of rural municipalities in Saskatchewan
 List of communities in Saskatchewan

References

External links 

Reciprocity

Division No. 1, Saskatchewan